Ryan Edward Kit Seng Lee Lambert (born 21 September 1998) is an Australian-born Malaysian professional footballer who plays as a midfielder for Malaysia Super League club Sabah.

Lambert was born in Kuala Lumpur, but then moved to Thailand and Australia at a young age. He played youth football with Richmond before starting his senior career with the side. After spending some time with Melbourne Victory's youth team, Lambert moved to the Netherlands in 2017, where he played for Achilles '29 and FC Den Bosch.

Early life
Lambert was born in Kuala Lumpur to an English father and Malaysian Chinese mother. The family then moved to Thailand, where they stayed for six months before relocating again to Melbourne, Australia.

Lambert has a twin brother, Declan, who is also a professional footballer. The two played together at Clifton Hill, Richmond, Achilles '29 and FC Den Bosch.

Club career
After playing youth football for FC Clifton Hill and Richmond, Lambert made his senior debut for Richmond aged just 15. In 2016, he played for one season for Melbourne Victory's youth team before departing after he suffered a major injury.

In 2018, the Lambert twins moved to Europe, and trialed with sides including Sparta Rotterdam and FC Dordrecht. The pair eventually signed for Dutch Tweede Divisie side Achilles '29. However, they left the club after it suffered relegation at the end of the 2017–18 Tweede Divisie.

The twins then moved to Eerste Divisie side FC Den Bosch in 2018. Their first-team opportunities were initially limited by the arrival of several other foreign players shortly after their signing. However, Lambert made his debut as a substitute in Den Bosch's opening game of the 2019–20 Eerste Divisie and by the 2020–21 Eerste Divisie season, both brothers featured regularly for the side. On 5 October 2020, Lambert tested positive for COVID-19. In March 2021, he was told that his contract with the club would not be extended.

On 28 April 2021, it was announced that Lambert had signed with Kuala Lumpur City. He was part of the team that won the 2021 Malaysia Cup.

Career statistics

Club

Honours

KL City
 Malaysia Cup: 2021
 AFC Cup runner-up: 2022

References

External links

1998 births
Living people
Sportspeople from Kuala Lumpur
Malaysian footballers
Australian soccer players
Malaysian people of English descent
Malaysian people of Chinese descent
Australian people of English descent
Malaysian emigrants to Australia
Association football midfielders
Richmond SC players
Achilles '29 players
FC Den Bosch players
Kuala Lumpur City F.C. players
National Premier Leagues players
Tweede Divisie players
Eerste Divisie players
Malaysian expatriate footballers
Australian expatriate soccer players
Expatriate footballers in the Netherlands
Australian expatriate sportspeople in the Netherlands
Twin sportspeople